In philately, an essay is a design for a proposed stamp submitted to the postal authorities for consideration but not used, or used after alterations have been made. By contrast, a proof is a trial printing of an accepted stamp.

Both essays and proofs are rare, as usually just a few are produced. Although intended for internal use by printers and official bodies, essays sometimes find their way onto the philatelic market.

See also 
 Prince Consort Essay.

References

External links

 Anglo-French Union The British Postal Museum & Archive
 Edward VIII Postage Stamp Essay Royal Philatelic Society of Canada
 Essay for the embossed stamp submitted after 1839 by Charles Whiting The British Postal Museum & Archive
 Flashback: Essays, The Stamp Designs That Also Ran The Collectors Weekly
 George VI stamps  The British Postal Museum & Archive
 Newfoundland bogus "Essay"
 Switzerland extracts from Essay Proof Journal 1945–1961

Philatelic terminology